The 2023 IIHF World Championship Division III will be an international ice hockey tournament run by the International Ice Hockey Federation.

The Group A tournament will be held in Cape Town, South Africa from 17 to 23 April and the Group B tournament in Sarajevo, Bosnia and Herzegovina from 27 February to 5 March 2023.

Group A tournament

Participants

Standings

Results
All times are local (UTC+2)

Group B tournament

Participants

Match officials
Four referees and seven linesmen were selected for the tournament.

Standings

Results
All times are local (UTC+1)

Statistics

Scoring leaders
List shows the top skaters sorted by points, then goals.

GP = Games played; G = Goals; A = Assists; Pts = Points; +/− = Plus/Minus; PIM = Penalties in Minutes; POS = Position
Source: IIHF.com

Goaltending leaders
Only the top five goaltenders, based on save percentage, who have played at least 40% of their team's minutes, are included in this list.

TOI = time on ice (minutes:seconds); SA = shots against; GA = goals against; GAA = goals against average; Sv% = save percentage; SO = shutouts
Source: IIHF.com

Awards

References

External links
Official website of Division IIIA
Official website of Division IIIB

2023
Division III
2023 IIHF World Championship Division III
2023 IIHF World Championship Division III
Sports competitions in Cape Town
Sports competitions in Sarajevo
2023 in South African sport
2023 in Bosnia and Herzegovina sport
April 2023 sports events in Africa
February 2023 sports events in Europe
March 2023 sports events in Europe
IIHF